is a Japanese manga series written by Kaoru Iwamoto and illustrated by Shinri Fuwa. It was published in six volumes from May 2004 to May 2008. Viz Media's Sublime imprint is publishing the series digitally in English.

Summary
The manga and OVA is set at a graphic design firm called Yebisu Graphics, where the most experienced, best looking, and top-notch workers are accepted. The franchise starts with Haruka Fujinami, a working-class college student who gets a job working for Yebisu under the direct authority of his new boss, the firm and domineering Takashi Daijō, who Haruka at first felt uneasy around until he soon discovers his newfound feelings and his boss's attraction towards him.

Media

Manga
The series is written by Kaoru Iwamoto and illustrated by Shinri Fuwa. It was serialized in Magazine Be × Boy, and later published in volumes by Biblos under their B-Boy imprint, with the first volume being released on May 10, 2004. After Biblos' bankruptcy, the series was acquired by Libre. Two side-stories were also released. In 2009, the series was temporarily removed from Amazon's search results.

In November 2005, Central Park Media's imprint Be Beautiful announced they licensed the series for English publication. After Central Park Media's bankruptcy, Viz Media's Sublime imprint announced they licensed the series digitally in 2011.

Volume list

Animated adaptations
An original video animation (OVA) adaption, titled Yebisu Celebrities 1st, was released on DVD by Movic on May 28, 2010. It was directed by Koichi Kikuchi and ran for 44 minutes.

An adaptation of the manga where only the mouths are animated and voice acting added, called an "animix", was made to be used as a demonstration for a similar product for Finder.

Drama CDs
Several drama CD adaptations have been released. The first on October 28, 2004, by Biblos' Cue Egg Label. The final one in the series was released by Libre on June 24, 2009. Another drama CD adaptation was produced by Marine Entertainment and released on June 22, 2007.

Reception
Connie from Slightly Biased Manga criticized the manga for some of its side characters and plots feeling more interesting than the main ones, overall calling it "a little disappointing". Manga News also criticized it, stating it is "unoriginal" and "has no substance".

References

External links
Yebisu Celebrities at Chil Chil
 

2010 anime OVAs
Anime 18
Japanese radio dramas
Josei manga
LGBT in anime and manga
SuBLime manga
Yaoi anime and manga